David Mulcahy may refer to:
John Duffy and David Mulcahy, British serial rapists and murderers
David Mulcahy (guitarist), New Zealand guitarist formerly of Jean-Paul Sartre Experience
David Mulcahy (drummer), English drummer from band Razorlight